Charlotte Elizabeth Austin (4 June 1878–21 November 1933) was an Australian community worker. Born on 4 June 1878 to George Fullerton and Georgina Sarah,  in Dubbo, New South Wales, her early schooling was at Rivière College in Woollahra. She later attended the University of Sydney and graduated with first-class honours in History and English under the supervision of noted historian George Arnold Wood.  She married the Reverend Alfred Herbert Austin on 21 March 1903 in Randwick Presbyterian Church.  After marriage the couple moved to South Australia where Alfred began as a Congregational minister, and in 1905 moved back to Sydney, where her husband became the pastor of Mosman Congregational Church.

Published works

References

1878 births
1933 deaths
19th-century Australian women
20th-century Australian women
19th-century Congregationalists
20th-century Congregationalists
Australian Congregationalists